Caspar Sibelius (9 June 1590 – 1 January 1658), was a Dutch Protestant minister.

Biography
Sibelius was born in Elberfeld (near Wuppertal) and was trained in Herborn and Siegen before attending Leiden University to study theology under Gomarus and Arminius, and Hebrew under Coddaeus. On his return he became minister in Randerode (where he married the mayor's daughter Maria Klock, in 1610), Geilenkirchen and Gulik. In 1617 he was sent to the Hague, where he received a stipend for preaching in Nijmegen. He was called the same year to Deventer, where he stayed for 30 years until leaving service in 1648.

In 1618 he attended the Overijssel Synod in Vollenhove and was chosen there to represent Overijssel in the Synod of Dordrecht, though he returned sick with fever in 1619 to Deventer. He was later chosen as revisor of the New Testament and Apocryphal gospels. In 1633–1634, he worked on the translation of the Staten-Bible in the house of Antonius Walaeus, professor of religion, on the Rapenburg in Leiden. He was there along with the original living translators, and the paid observers:
 as representative of Overijssel with the revisers of the New Testament were Henricus Arnoldi van der Linden, minister at Delft and son of the earlier translator, for South Holland,
 Willem van Nieuwenhuizen (Guilhelmus Nieuhusius), rector of the school at Haerlem, for North Holland,
 Karel Dematius (Carolus Dematius), minister at Middelburg, for Zeeland,
 Ludovicus Gerardus à Renesse, minister at Maarsen, for Utrecht.

Appointed revisors who were unable to come that day:
 Sebastian Damman, minister at Zutphen, who had also been one of the scribes at the Synod of Dordrecht, for Gelderland, due to imprisonment by the Spanish
 Henricus Alting, who as professor of divinity at Heidelberg had also been called to the Synod of Dordrecht by the Elector Palatine, but was now professor of divinity at Groningen, for Groningen, due to travel in Germany
 Bernardus Fullenius, minister at Leeuwarden, who was also one of the revisers of the Old Testament, for Friesland, due to being unable to get permission to travel to Leiden.

Sibelius died in Deventer.

Works
 De sacrificio Abrahami. Daventr, 1624, Amsterdam, 1637
 De monomachiâ Jacobi cum Deo, Deventer, 1630
 Conciones sacrae in D. Judae epistolam, Amsterdam, 1631-1637
 in Caput 16 Matthaei, Amsterdam, 1633
 in historiam sanati lunatici, Amsterdam, 1634
 Homiliae 16 in historiam transformationis Christi, Amsterdam, 1634
 Commentarius in Psalmum 16, Amsterdam, 1635
 Mosis ars bellica contra Amalekitos, Amsterdam, 1637
 De dedrachmis et in Canticum Simeonis, Amsterdam, 1639
 Homiliae octo in Canticum Simeonis, Amsterdam, 1641
 In passionem, mortem et sepulturam Christi, Amsterdam, 1642
 Historia Hiskiae, regis Judae, lethaliter aegrotantis, divinitus sanati et erga Deum grati; seu caput 38 Esaiae Prophetae, homiliis 36 explicatum, 1643
 Conciones in 14 priorss versus 18 capitis Matthaei, Deventer, 1647, Amsterdam, 1669
 Schole der Goddelijke versoeckingen in 31 predicatien over de historie van Abrahams offerhande, Deventer, 1655
 Christianae precationes et gratiarum actiones, Deventer, 1658
 Christelycke ghebeden en dankzeggingen, Amsterdam, 1667
 Concionum anniversariarum in dies festos et dominicos tomi tres, Amsterdam, 1665

References

Caspar Sibelius in The Dutch Bible, The Christian review and clerical magazine, 1829

1590 births
1658 deaths
Protestant writers
17th-century Dutch Calvinist and Reformed ministers
German Calvinist and Reformed ministers
17th-century Calvinist and Reformed theologians
German Calvinist and Reformed theologians
17th-century German Protestant theologians
Dutch Calvinist and Reformed theologians
Frans Hals
Participants in the Synod of Dort
German male non-fiction writers
Clergy from Wuppertal
17th-century German writers
17th-century German male writers